The Levy House, at 111-121 California Ave. in Reno, Nevada, is a historic Classical Revival-style house that was built in 1906.  It was home of William Levy, a merchant and mining businessman.

It was listed on the National Register of Historic Places in 1983, qualifying as a high-quality example of the Classical Revival style, for its association with Levy, and as a significant component of local history.

The building was moved c. 1940, turning it 90 degrees and repositioning it on the lot.

References 

Houses on the National Register of Historic Places in Nevada
Neoclassical architecture in Nevada
Houses completed in 1906
National Register of Historic Places in Reno, Nevada
Houses in Reno, Nevada
1906 establishments in Nevada